A mirror is an object whose surface reflects an image.

Mirror, mirrors or MIRROR may also refer to:
 Reflection (mathematics), creating the mirror image of a shape across a point, line or plane
 The "silver mirror", created in chemical tests involving Tollens' reagent
 Current mirror, an electric circuit designed to copy a current through one active device by controlling the current in another active device of a circuit
 Magnetic mirror, a magnetic field configuration
 Acoustic mirror, a device used to focus and amplify sound waves

Geography
 Mirror, Alberta, a place in Canada
 Mirror Lakes, a set of lakes in New Zealand

Computing
 AirPlay Mirroring, an iOS 5 feature for wireless video streaming
 Disk mirroring, replicating the content of an entire storage disk
 Mirror site, an Internet server which replicates content available elsewhere
 Mirror (programming), a type of reflection mechanism in programming
 Port mirroring, replicating network packets for diagnostic purposes

Books and publications
Mirrors, novel by Naguib Mahfouz
 Mirror, a short poem by American author Sylvia Plath
 Daily Mirror, a newspaper based in the United Kingdom
 Montreal Mirror, an alternative weekly newspaper based in Quebec, Canada
 Mumbai Mirror, a compact daily newspaper based in Mumbai, India
 Mirror (Pakistani magazine), a Pakistani social magazine published from 1951 to 1972
 Australian Woman's Mirror, an Australian weekly magazine published from 1924 to 1961
 The Mirror (Western Australia), published from 1921 until 1956

Film
 Mirror Releasing, now United Artists Releasing, a film distribution company
 Mirror (film), a 1975 Russian art film directed by Andrei Tarkovsky
 Mirrors (1978 film), a horror film by Noel Black
 Mirrors (2007 film), a Canadian short drama film
 Mirrors (2008 film), a supernatural horror film starring Kiefer Sutherland
 The Mirror (disambiguation)
 The Mirror (1997 film), a 1997 Iranian film
 The Mirror (2014 film), a British found footage horror film

TV
 "Mirror", a 2008 episode from the television series Legend of the Seeker
 Mirror ident, a 2007 television ident for BBC Two

Music
 Mirror (multimedia project), a multimedia project created by Thomas Anselmi
 Mirror (group), a Hong Kong boy band
 Mirrors (Ohio band), an early 1970s proto-punk/psychedelic garage band from Cleveland, OH  
Mirrors (band), a synthpop band from Brighton

Albums
 Mirror (Emitt Rhodes album), 1971
 Mirror (Graham Central Station album), 1976
 Mirror, a 1988 album by One 2 Many
 Mirror (The Rapture album), 1999
 Mirror (D'espairsRay album), 2007
 Mirror, a 2008 album by I'm Not a Gun
 Mirror (Charles Lloyd album), 2009
Mirror (Jacky Terrasson album), 2007
Mirrors (Blue Öyster Cult album), or the title song
Mirrors (Peggy Lee album), 1975
 Mirrors (Sandra album), 1986
 Mirrors (Joe Chambers album), 1999
Mirrors (Misery Signals album), or its title song, "Mirrors"
Mirrors EP, a 2009 EP by alternative rock band Young Guns
Mirrors, an album by Miki Furukawa

Songs
 "Mirror" (Gackt song), 2000
 "Mirror" (Lil Wayne song), 2011
 "Mirror" (Sigrid song), 2021
 "Mirrors" (Natalia Kills song), 2010 
 "Mirrors" (Justin Timberlake song), 2013
 "Mirrors" (Tohoshinki song), 2019
 "Mirror" (Porter Robinson song), 2020
 "Mirror", by Bazzi from the album Cosmic, 2018
 "Mirror", a 1996 song by X-Perience from the album Magic Fields
 "Mirrors", a 2014 song from White Noise by PVRIS
 "Mirrors", a 2017 song by Niall Horan from the album Flicker

Other
 Mirror stage, a psychological development step
 Mirror armour, a type of cuirass
 Mirror (dinghy), a small boat

See also
 
 
 The Mirror (disambiguation)
 Dark Mirror (disambiguation)
 Mirror Mirror (disambiguation)
 Mirror image, the reflection of an image in a mirror
 Mirroring (disambiguation)
 Spiegel (disambiguation)
 Zerkalo (disambiguation) (Russian for mirror)